The X'Trapolis (also stylized as X'TRAPOLIS) is a series of multiple units designed and built by Alstom. The trains have high floors, and are available in both single- and double-deck configurations. They are typically powered by an external electrical source, but may also be powered by batteries, hydrogen or diesel-electric power units.

Models

Current 
 X'Trapolis Duplex - Réseau Express Régional (Paris, France)
 Locally designated MI 2N;
 "Altéo" for line A, introduced 1997.
 "Eole" for line E, introduced 1998. Soon to be replaced by the X'Trapolis Cityduplex.
 Locally designated MI 09 for line A, introduced 2011.
 X'Trapolis 100 - Metro Trains Melbourne (Victoria, Australia) and Valparaíso Metro (Chile). Melbourne version introduced in 2002 and Valparaíso version introduced in 2005.
  - Valparaíso Metro and Metrotrén ( and  - Santiago) (all Chile), introduced 2015. Similar to Civia units used on the Renfe Cercanías (Spain).
 X'Trapolis Mega - Metrorail (South Africa), introduced 2017.
 Transperth C-series - Transperth (Perth, Western Australia), entered service in 2023.

Future 
 X'Trapolis Cityduplex (aka RER NG) - RER (Paris), expected to enter service in 2023. Set to replace the MI 2N "Eole".
 X'Trapolis 2.0 - Metro Trains Melbourne (Victoria, Australia), expected to enter service in 2024.
 X'Trapolis Ireland - DART (Dublin, Ireland), expected to be delivered in 2024 and enter service in 2025. 13 units will be battery-electric.

Cancelled 

 "X'trapolis UK" - Design offered on 15 September 2009 for the Thameslink rolling stock programme. Bid subsequently withdrawn on 22 October of the same year.

References

External links 
 Alstom X'Trapolis official site

Alstom multiple units